The  is a group of companies centered around the Odakyu Electric Railway company which is based in Shinjuku, Tokyo, Japan. The group originated as a rail transport operator, but now also has diverse operations such as in real estate, retail, B2B,  finance (credit card), fiber optic networking, personal storage, travel sales, and urban, long distance as well as tour bus service.  It comprises 101 companies as of July 14, 2017. It also owns several recreational facilities, including a golf course, campground, hot springs resort, and sailing resort, all of which are situated to bring more passengers onto the core business, the railway network.  All these are separate companies and retain their own branding and logos, albeit with coordination among group companies and cross ownership, though many do, other member companies may not bear the name Odakyu at all.

Transport

The railway network of the group includes the three lines of the Odakyu Electric Railway, the Enoshima Electric Railway, and the Hakone Tozan Railway companies. It operates the Hakone Ropeway.  Odakyu, like many railway companies in Japan, also operates an extensive set of feeder buses all throughout the line that complement city bus services, as well as limited long distance bus services.  They include 16 brands, major ones are Kanachu Bus (Kanagawa Chuo Kotsu, 神奈中バス・神奈川中央交通), Odakyu Bus (小田急バス), Tachikawa Bus (立川バス), Enoden Bus (江ノ電バス), Odakyu Hakone Highway Bus (小田急箱根高速バス), Hakone Tozan Bus (箱根登山バス), Tokai Bus(東海バス). serving Tokyo (Tama), Kanagawa, Hakone/Mount Fuji and Izu Peninsula areas.  Other group operations include taxi and Hakone tourist boats.

Retail

The Odakyu Group member companies runs a large variety of retail.  Large department stores by Shinjuku, Machida and Fujisawa stations, called Odakyu Hyakkaten.  It also runs a chain of supermarkets called Odakyu OX across west Tokyo and Kanagawa Prefecture, as well as a chain of convenience stores (Odakyu Mart) and kiosk outlets (OX Shop) found in various Odakyu line stations, of which maintain the OX brand logos.  The group member companies even consist of other areas such as affiliated florists and auto dealerships.

Hospitality and Real Estate

Odakyu Group includes hotels, resorts (Odakyu Resorts 小田急リゾーツ), travel agencies, outlet malls, golf courses, and restaurants, common among large railway companies in Japan, and even residential apartment blocks.  Odakyu also runs a number of large hotels, including Odakyu Southern Tower in Yoyogi, as well as others in Shinjuku and Izu Peninsula.

B2B services
Odakyu Engineering provides engineering services to other corporations and partners.

TSE listing

Along with Odakyu Electric Railway, Kanagawa Central Transport Kanachu Bus (神奈川中央交通株式会社) is listed on Section 1 of the Tokyo Stock Exchange.
OER (Odakyu Electric Railway) is listed on Section 1 of Tokyo Stock Exchange, and is a company on Fortune magazine's Global 500 list.

Companies listed on the Tokyo Stock Exchange
Holding companies based in Tokyo
Transport companies based in Tokyo
Japanese companies established in 1948
Holding companies established in 1948
Transport companies established in 1948